Catuna crithea, the common pathfinder, is a butterfly in the family Nymphalidae. It is found in Guinea, Sierra Leone, Liberia, Ivory Coast, Ghana, Togo, Nigeria, Cameroon, Bioko, Angola, the Democratic Republic of the Congo, Sudan, Uganda, Kenya, Tanzania and northern and western Zambia. The habitat consists of dense lowland forests and the riverine forest floor.

Adults are attracted to fallen fruit, especially of Cola and Ficus species.

The larvae feed on Bersama abyssinica, Mimusops kummel, Malacantha alnifolia, Aningueria robusta, Manilkara obovata, Bequaertiodendron, Englerophytum, Pachystela, Vincentella, Wildemaniodoxa, Gambeya, Pouteria, Chrysophyllum and Synsepalum species. Other sources list plants from the Ochnaceae and Apocynaceae families.

References

Butterflies described in 1773
Limenitidinae
Butterflies of Africa
Taxa named by Dru Drury